Neoregelia carcharodon is a species of flowering plant in the genus Neoregelia. This species is endemic to Brazil.

Cultivars

 Neoregelia 'Arching Star'
 Neoregelia 'Bang'
 Neoregelia 'Big Bang'
 Neoregelia 'Blast Furnace'
 Neoregelia 'Blue Shark'
 Neoregelia 'Bobbie Hull'
 Neoregelia 'Can Can'
 Neoregelia 'Cauldera'
 Neoregelia 'Crater'
 Neoregelia 'Grey Nurse'
 Neoregelia 'Gummy'
 Neoregelia 'Hilda Ariza'
 Neoregelia 'Jaws'
 Neoregelia 'Jaws Too'
 Neoregelia 'Pink on Black'
 Neoregelia 'Raspberry Ripple'
 Neoregelia 'Rouge'
 Neoregelia 'Ruby Frost'
 Neoregelia 'Scarlet Imp'
 Neoregelia 'Triffid'
 Neoregelia 'White Ribbons'
 Neoregelia 'Wobbegong'
 Neoregelia 'Yang'
 Neoregelia 'Yin'

References

BSI Cultivar Registry Retrieved 11 October 2009

carcharodon
Flora of Brazil